Ingrid Zimmermann  (born 21 December 1959) is a German footballer who played for the Germany women's national football team from 1984–1986. She competed in 11 matches for the team. On club level she played for FSV Frankfurt.

References

External links
 
 Profile at soccerdonna.de

1959 births
Living people
German women's footballers
Place of birth missing (living people)
Germany women's international footballers
Women's association football defenders